Marjorie Celona (born January 7, 1981) is an American-Canadian writer. Their debut novel, Y, published in 2012, won the Waterstones 11 literary prize and was a shortlisted nominee for the Center for Fiction's Flaherty-Dunnan First Novel Prize, the Amazon.ca First Novel Award and a longlisted nominee for the Scotiabank Giller Prize.

Life and career 
Born and raised in Victoria, British Columbia, Celona studied creative writing at the University of Victoria before attending the Iowa Writers' Workshop. Celona has published stories, book reviews, and essays in The O. Henry Prize Stories, The Best American Nonrequired Reading, The Southern Review, Harvard Review, and elsewhere.

Celona was winner of the Bronwen Wallace Award in 2008 for their short story "Othello". Celona's short story, "Counterblast," won a 2018 O. Henry Award, and was selected as a juror favorite by author Ottessa Moshfegh.

Celona's most recent novel, How a Woman Becomes a Lake, was published in March 2020.

Celona currently teaches in the MFA program at the University of Oregon.

References

External links
Marjorie Celona

Writers from Victoria, British Columbia
Living people
21st-century American novelists
21st-century Canadian novelists
1981 births
21st-century Canadian short story writers
21st-century American short story writers
Canadian non-binary writers
O. Henry Award winners
21st-century Canadian LGBT people